The National Bank of Moldova is the central bank of the Republic of Moldova.

The National Bank of Moldova is an autonomous public legal entity and is responsible to the Parliament of the Republic of Moldova. The primary objective of the National Bank of Moldova shall be to ensure and maintain the price stability. Without prejudice to its primary objective, the National Bank of Moldova shall promote and maintain a financial system based on market principles and shall support the general economic policy of the state. The National Bank cooperates with the Government with the view to achieving its objectives and, according to the Law, undertakes the necessary measures to implement such cooperation. The NBM periodically informs the public about macroeconomic analysis, financial market evolution and statistic data, including on money supply, credit granting, balance of payments and foreign exchange market.

Governors
Leonid Tălmaci served as the first Governor of the National Bank (1991–2009). Dorin Drăguțanu has served as the Governor of the National Bank since November 2009.
On the 11th of March 2016, Sergiu Cioclea was elected as the new Governor by the country's parliament. He was succeeded by Octavian Armașu in November 2018.

See also

Economy of Moldova
Moldovan leu

References

External links
 National Bank of Moldova official site
 Free Forex E-learning Platform For Moldovians

Moldova
Economy of Moldova
Banks of Moldova
1991 establishments in Moldova
Banks established in 1991